The Philco Television Playhouse is an American television anthology series that was broadcast live on NBC from 1948 to 1955. Produced by Fred Coe, the series was sponsored by Philco. It was one of the most respected dramatic shows of the Golden Age of Television, winning a 1954 Peabody Award and receiving eight Emmy nominations between 1951 and 1956.

Season overview and highlights
For the first season, Philco entered into a partnership with the Actors’ Equity Association to produce adaptations of Broadway plays and musicals with Bert Lytell, silent film era actor and Honorary Life President of Equity, as host.
The first episode was Dinner at Eight by George S. Kaufman and Edna Ferber.   Ronald Wayne Rodman, in his book Tuning in: American Narrative Television Music, noted, "Despite ensuing complications over the legalities of broadcasting copyrighted plays on television and several legal battles that ensued, the show flourished." That flourishing came at a cost, however, as the trade publication Variety reported in January 1949 that the program had gone $126,000 over budget since its premiere. Increased costs were said to result from fees spent for rights to produce plays and "considerably higher talent fees", with Jose Ferrer cited as an example. Philco executives were "reportedly seriously disturbed" that, despite the expenditures, the show had yet to make the top 10 shows in ratings, while Toast of the Town (its competition on CBS) was consistently rated second or third.

The title of the show was briefly changed to Repertory Theatre and Arena Theatre during part of the first season, but then reverted to The Philco Television Playhouse. 

The second season consisted mostly of adaptations of popular novels from the Book of the Month Club. During later seasons, both original stories and adaptations were used.

Beginning in October 1951, Philco shared sponsorship of the program with Goodyear, with the title alternating between Philco Television Playhouse and Goodyear Television Playhouse to reflect that week's sponsor. (Reference sources sometimes refer to the alternating programs collectively as the Philco/Goodyear Television Playhouse or the Philco-Goodyear Television Playhouse, although neither are actual program titles.)

In the sixth season, Cathleen Nesbitt and Maureen Stapleton starred in Chayefsky's The Mother (April 4, 1954). This is one of the rare teleplays from television's Golden Age to be restaged on TV decades later, a Great Performances production on October 24, 1994, with Anne Bancroft and Joan Cusack.

The seventh season began September 19, 1954, with E. G. Marshall and Eva Marie Saint in Chayefsky's Middle of the Night, a play which moved to Broadway 15 months later and was filmed under the same title by Columbia Pictures in 1959.

A single source suggests that Philco Television Playhouse continued into 1956, although most other sources agree that the final production came on October 2, 1955. This was Robert Alan Aurthur's A Man Is Ten Feet Tall, co-starring Don Murray and Sidney Poitier, which was adapted and expanded into the 1957 MGM feature film, Edge of the City, with Poitier recreating his original role and John Cassavetes in Murray's part.

On October 16, 1955, Alcoa took over sponsorship from Philco and The Alcoa Hour alternated with Goodyear Television Playhouse for two more seasons.

Cast and writers
Among the many performers on the Philco Television Playhouse were James Dean, Lillian Gish, Janet De Gore, Melvyn Douglas, Grace Kelly, Jack Klugman, Cloris Leachman, Walter Matthau, Steve McQueen, Paul Muni, ZaSu Pitts, Eva Marie Saint, Everett Sloane, Kim Stanley, Eli Wallach and Joanne Woodward. Many of these actors were making their first television appearance; one was Jose Ferrer, who recreated his stage performance in a one-hour television condensation of Cyrano de Bergerac on January 9, 1949, a full year before the 1950 film version, for which Ferrer won an Oscar, was released. Another was Paul Muni, who starred in the 1948 presentation Counsellor-at Law.

The series launched the television writing careers of Robert Alan Aurthur, Paddy Chayefsky, Sumner Locke Elliott, Horton Foote, Tad Mosel, William Templeton, Arnold Schulman, and Gore Vidal. Its most famous drama was Chayefsky's Marty (May 24, 1953), which starred Rod Steiger and was later made into a movie that won an Academy Award for Ernest Borgnine.

Critical reception 
The trade publication Variety commended the Playhouse's "Pride and Prejudice" episode (January 23, 1949) and generalized, "It's getting so that viewers can take for granted this show's superior taste and overall production excellence. This is video at its adult best." Regarding that specific production, the review praised Samuel Taylor's adaptation, Fred Coe's direction, Harry Sosnick's musical score, and the acting of Madge Evans and Viola Roache.

U.S. television ratings
 
Seasonal rankings (based on average total viewers per episode) of The Philco Television Playhouse on NBC.

In popular culture
In 2006, the NBC series Studio 60 on the Sunset Strip referenced The Philco Television Playhouse as The Philco Comedy Hour, a comedy show that aired on the fictional NBS network. Eli Wallach made a guest appearance on Studio 60, playing a former show writer who was blacklisted in the 1950s.

Episodes

Season 1 (1948–1949)

Season 2 (1949–1950)

Season 3 (1950–1951)

Awards and nominations

References

External links
Museum of Broadcast Communications profile

The Philco Television Playhouse at CVTA

1948 American television series debuts
1955 American television series endings
1940s American anthology television series
1950s American anthology television series
1940s American drama television series
1950s American drama television series
Black-and-white American television shows
English-language television shows
American live television series
NBC original programming